Eddie Bicoy Laure (born July 6, 1977) is a Filipino former professional basketball player and politician. Known by many as The Dominator and more recently, The Bounty Hunter for his daring and stunning ability to search and get loose balls on the court, he is a former MBA MVP.

Amateur career
Laure played for the Adamson Falcons in the UAAP from 1994 to 1997 alongside future PBA superstars Kenneth Duremdes and Marlou Aquino. He also played in the PBL during his time prior to the pro ranks, winning an MVP once.

Professional career

Metropolitan Basketball Association
In 1998, Laure joined the Batangas Blades in the newly formed professional Metropolitan Basketball Association. Despite playing for the lowly Blades teams from 1998 to 2000, Laure was the cornerstone of the franchise, playing in several All-Star games and the Mythical Team award.

In 2001, he was later joined by former Manila Metrostars players Rommel Adducul and Alex Compton to lead Batangas to their only MBA National Championship over the Negros Slashers. Laure was later named the Most Valuable Player of the 2001 season and the last player in MBA history to win the award before its closure in 2002.

Short return to the PBL
After the MBA's demise, Laure joined the Welcoat Paintmasters in the 2002 PBL Challenge Cup. Again, Laure played with a star-studded team of Rommel Adducul, Ronald Tubid, Marc Pingris, and Ervin Sotto.

Laure was named in the Mythical Five of the said tournament and the Paintmasters won the title via a 3–0 sweep over Dazz Dishwashing. Laure then opted to turn pro again in 2003.

Philippine Basketball Association

In 2003, Laure was selected third overall by the Shell Turbo Chargers in the PBA Draft. He had a decent rookie campaign with Shell posting double figures in points but was unable to lead the Turbo Chargers to a respectable record.

He was traded in 2004 to Purefoods for Billy Mamaril but struggled in his stint with the TJ Hotdogs while nursing a knee injury. The 6'4 forward played for just 24 games in the 2004–05 season, and hardly a factor on offense but had a few games where he shone on the defensive end.

In the 2005–06 season, he joined the Alaska Aces and was a key contributor off the bench. Due to the injury of Reynel Hugnatan, he was given significant playing time. Along with Hugnatan, Laure was also joined by John Ferriols, a fellow former MBA MVP, in a trio of former MBA superstars in the Alaska fold.

24 hours after the 2008 Rookie Draft proper, he was traded to his former PBL team, the Rain or Shine Elasto Painters, together with fifth overall pick Solomon Mercado for former No. 1 pick, Joe Devance, and two future second round picks.

In the off-season of 2010, he was traded to the Powerade Tigers together with Rain or Shine's 1st round pick in 2011 in exchange for Larry Rodriguez.

He also has a stint with the AirAsia Philippine Patriots in the ABL in 2011.

Prior to the start of the 2012–13 PBA season, he then re-signed with the Alaska Aces for his second stint with the team. His veteran presence provided leadership to the young guns.

He was relegated to the reserved injured list for the entire 2013–14 season, and was placed in the dispersal pool at season's end. He was picked by Blackwater Elite during the 2014 PBA Expansion Draft.

Coaching career
In November 2016, Laure formally ended his playing career in the PBA, after 13 years, to concentrate on his new job as the assistant coach of the UST Golden Tigresses women's varsity basketball team in the UAAP.

Political career
In the 2022 local elections, Laure ran for a seat in the Sangguniang Bayan of the municipality of Katipunan, Zamboanga del Norte under the Partido Demokratiko Pilipino-Lakas ng Bayan or PDP-Laban. He won in the said election, and will serve starting June 30 of the same year.

Personal life
He and Jovie have two daughters, Ennajie (EJ) and Ejiya, and two sons, Echo and Fofo. Ennajie currently plays for the Chery Tiggo Crossovers (formerly Foton Tornadoes), and Ejiiya currently plays for the UST Golden Tigresses. Their older son, Echo, plays for the UST Tiger Cubs.

References

1977 births
Living people
Alaska Aces (PBA) players
Basketball players from Zamboanga del Norte
Blackwater Bossing players
Terrafirma Dyip players
People from Dipolog
Philippines men's national basketball team players
Filipino men's basketball players
Powerade Tigers players
Rain or Shine Elasto Painters players
Shell Turbo Chargers players
Small forwards
Magnolia Hotshots players
Adamson Soaring Falcons basketball players
Shell Turbo Chargers draft picks